The 2015 Copa Sudamericana elimination stages were played from August 11 to September 17, 2015. A total of 46 teams competed in the elimination stages to decide 15 of the 16 places in the final stages of the 2015 Copa Sudamericana.

Draw
The draw of the tournament was held on July 16, 2015, 20:00 UTC−4, at the Salón Joao Havelange of the CONMEBOL Convention Centre in Luque, Paraguay.

For the first stage, the 32 teams were divided into two zones:
South Zone: The 16 teams from Bolivia, Chile, Paraguay, and Uruguay were drawn into eight ties.
North Zone: The 16 teams from Colombia, Ecuador, Peru, and Venezuela were drawn into eight ties.

Teams which qualified for berths 1 were drawn against teams which qualified for berths 4, and teams which qualified for berths 2 were drawn against teams which qualified for berths 3, with the former hosting the second leg in both cases. Teams from the same association could not be drawn into the same tie.

For the second stage, the 30 teams, including the 16 winners of the first stage (eight from South Zone, eight from North Zone), whose identity was not known at the time of the draw, and the 14 teams which entered the second stage, were divided into three sections:
Winners of the first stage: The 16 winners of the first stage were drawn into eight ties, with the order of legs decided by draw. Teams from the same association could be drawn into the same tie.
Brazil: The eight teams from Brazil were drawn into four ties. Teams which qualified for berths 1–4 were drawn against teams which qualified for berths 5–8, with the former hosting the second leg.
Argentina: The six teams from Argentina were drawn into three ties. Teams which qualified for berths 1–3 were drawn against teams which qualified for berths 4–6, with the former hosting the second leg.

Format
In the elimination stages (first stage and second stage), each tie was played on a home-and-away two-legged basis. If tied on aggregate, the away goals rule was used. If still tied, the penalty shoot-out was used to determine the winner (no extra time was played). The 15 winners of the second stage (eight from winners of the first stage, four from Brazil, three from Argentina) advanced to the round of 16 to join the defending champions (River Plate).

First stage
The first legs were played on August 11–13, and the second legs were played on August 18–20, 2015.

|-
!colspan=6|South Zone

|-
!colspan=6|North Zone

|}

Match G1

Juventud won 4–3 on aggregate and advanced to the second stage (Match O14).

Match G2

Nacional won 3–0 on aggregate and advanced to the second stage (Match O3).

Match G3

Libertad won 2–1 on aggregate and advanced to the second stage (Match O9).

Match G4

Nacional won 5–2 on aggregate and advanced to the second stage (Match O1).

Match G5

Defensor Sporting won 3–2 on aggregate and advanced to the second stage (Match O2).

Match G6

Universidad Católica won 3–1 on aggregate and advanced to the second stage (Match O9).

Match G7

Olimpia won 4–0 on aggregate and advanced to the second stage (Match O6).

Match G8

Sportivo Luqueño won 7–2 on aggregate and advanced to the second stage (Match O4).

Match G9

Tied 0–0 on aggregate, Deportes Tolima won on penalties and advanced to the second stage (Match O13).

Match G10

Deportivo La Guaira won 2–1 on aggregate and advanced to the second stage (Match O4).

Match G11

Emelec won 6–1 on aggregate and advanced to the second stage (Match O14).

Match G12

Junior won 5–4 on aggregate and advanced to the second stage (Match O13).

Match G13

Universitario won 6–2 on aggregate and advanced to the second stage (Match O2).

Match G14

LDU Quito won 3–1 on aggregate and advanced to the second stage (Match O1).

Match G15

Águilas Doradas won 3–1 on aggregate and advanced to the second stage (Match O6).

Match G16

Santa Fe won 3–0 on aggregate and advanced to the second stage (Match O3).

Second stage
The first legs were played on August 18–20 and 26–27, and the second legs were played on August 25–27 and September 15–17, 2015.

|}

Match O1

LDU Quito won 2–0 on aggregate and advanced to the round of 16 (Match A).

Match O2

Defensor Sporting won 4–0 on aggregate and advanced to the round of 16 (Match B).

Match O3

Santa Fe won 2–1 on aggregate and advanced to the round of 16 (Match C).

Match O4

Sportivo Luqueño won 5–1 on aggregate and advanced to the round of 16 (Match D).

Match O5

Brasília won 2–0 on aggregate and advanced to the round of 16 (Match E).

Match O6

Olimpia won 3–2 on aggregate and advanced to the round of 16 (Match F).

Match O7

Huracán won 6–2 on aggregate and advanced to the round of 16 (Match G).

Match O8

Chapecoense won 4–1 on aggregate and advanced to the round of 16 (Match H).

Match O9

Libertad won 4–2 on aggregate and advanced to the round of 16 (Match H).

Match O10

Sport Recife won 4–2 on aggregate and advanced to the round of 16 (Match G).

Match O11

Independiente won 2–1 on aggregate and advanced to the round of 16 (Match F).

Match O12

Atlético Paranaense won 3–0 on aggregate and advanced to the round of 16 (Match E).

Match O13

Deportes Tolima won 2–1 on aggregate and advanced to the round of 16 (Match D).

Match O14

Tied 0–0 on aggregate, Emelec won on penalties and advanced to the round of 16 (Match C).

Match O15

Lanús won 6–2 on aggregate and advanced to the round of 16 (Match B).

References

External links
Copa Sudamericana 2015, CONMEBOL.com 

1